Nicolas Mahut and Édouard Roger-Vasselin were the defending champions, but they lost in the semifinals to Aisam-ul-Haq Qureshi and Jean-Julien Rojer.
Rohan Bopanna and Colin Fleming won the title, defeating Qureshi and Rojer in the final, 6–4, 7–6(7–3).

Seeds

Draw

Draw

References
 Main Draw

Open 13 - Doubles
2013 Doubles